The Decameron is a 14th-century writing by Italian author Giovanni Boccaccio, circa 1353.

Decameron may also refer to:
 The Decameron (1971 film), a 1971 Italian film by Pier Paolo Pasolini
 Decameron (band), a British folk / progressive rock band
 Decameron (album), a 1992 album by Epidemic